Fotis Georgiou (born 19 July 1985) is a Greek professional footballer who plays as a midfielder for Super League 2 club Diagoras.

Career
Born in Arta, Georgiou began playing football for Marko F.C. in the Gamma Ethniki.

References

External links
Profile at Onsports.gr

1985 births
Living people
Greek footballers
Kallithea F.C. players
Ionikos F.C. players
PAS Giannina F.C. players
Atromitos F.C. players
AEL Kalloni F.C. players
PAE Kerkyra players
Super League Greece players
Association football wingers
Footballers from Arta, Greece